Pontypridd Graig railway station was a railway station located in the South Wales valleys town of Pontypridd, on the Barry Railway. Although the line was opened for mineral traffic on 18 July 1889 to take coal from Rhondda to the Docks, the passenger service did not start until 16 March 1896 after much lobbying from local residents along the line. On that date, Barry services commenced between the Taff Vale station at Porth and Barry where the train terminated in the bay platform (Platform 4). On 7 June 1897, a new passenger service began between Pontypridd and Cardiff Clarence Road via St Fagans and Cardiff Riverside. Train journeys commenced at Pontypridd because the Taff Vale was not willing to allow direct competition with its own services from Porth to Cardiff Queen Street. The station was closed to passengers on 5 May 1930 by the GWR who diverted trains via Treforest Junction to its main station at Pontypridd Central.

History

The station was opened by the Barry Railway on 16 March 1896.

The Barry Railway was amalgamated with the Great Western Railway on 1 January 1922, and the station was renamed Pontypridd Graig on 1 July 1924, to avoid confusion with the former Taff Vale Railway station, which had also been named Pontypridd, and which was renamed  the same year.

Passenger services along the former Barry line north of Tonteg Junction were diverted via  (also on the former Taff Vale Railway) and Pontypridd Central from 5 May 1930, and Pontypridd Graig station was closed.

Present day

Today, nothing of the station or platforms remain. The tunnel mouth is situated in the grounds of Dewi Sant Hospital car park, just behind the modern day Pontypridd railway station, on Albert Road, the Graig, Pontypridd. The other end of the tunnel is in the grounds of the University of South Wales, which is some distance away.

References

External links

Pontypridd Graig Station

Disused railway stations in Rhondda Cynon Taf
Pontypridd
Former Barry Railway stations
Railway stations in Great Britain opened in 1896
Railway stations in Great Britain closed in 1930